The men's 400 metres event at the 2004 African Championships in Athletics was held in Brazzaville, Republic of the Congo on July 14–16.

Medalists

Results

Heats

Semifinals

Final

References
Results

2004 African Championships in Athletics
400 metres at the African Championships in Athletics